Ouest Department (originally Sud-Ouest Department) was one of the original four departments of Ivory Coast. It was established in 1961, along with Centre Department, Nord Department, and Sud-Est Department. During Ouest Department's existence, departments were the first-level administrative subdivisions of Ivory Coast.

The department was established as Sud-Ouest Department. Using current boundaries as a reference, the territory of Sud-Ouest Department was composed of Haut-Sassandra Region, Gôh Region, Montagnes District, and Nawa Region.

In 1963, Centre-Ouest Department was created by dividing Sud-Ouest Department. As a result of this division, Sud-Ouest Department was renamed Ouest Department. Using current boundaries as a reference, in 1963 Ouest Department occupied the same territory as Montagnes District.

In 1969, Ouest Department and the other five existing departments of the country were abolished and replaced with 24 new departments. The territory of Ouest Department became the new departments of Biankouma, Danané, Guiglo, and Man.

References
"Districts of Côte d'Ivoire (Ivory Coast)", statoids.com, accessed 17 February 2016.

Former departments of Ivory Coast
1961 establishments in Ivory Coast
1969 disestablishments in Ivory Coast
States and territories established in 1961
States and territories disestablished in 1969